The Baptistery of St. John the Baptist of Thessaloniki,  considered as the oldest early Christian baptistery and assigned to the building complex of a five-aisled episcopal basilica of the fifth century.

The baptistery was identified at the excavations of the Byzantine church of Hagia Sophia. It consists of a room with platforms and includes a font. It was in direct contact with the royal in the 5th century from the hallway with a mosaic floor.

References 

Byzantine church buildings in Thessaloniki
Baptisteries
5th-century architecture in Greece
Buildings and structures of the Eastern Orthodox Church